Izeh County is in Khuzestan province, Iran. The capital of the county is the city of Izeh. At the 2006 census, the county's population was 193,510 in 36,123 households. The following census in 2011 counted 203,621 people in 45,090 households. At the 2016 census, the county's population was 198,871 in 48,682 households. Dehdez District was separated from the county on 27 July 2021 and became Dezpart County.The vast majority of its population are from the Bakhtiari tribe, one of the largest in Iran.

Administrative divisions

The population history and structural changes of Izeh County's administrative divisions over three consecutive censuses are shown in the following table. The latest census shows three districts, 10 rural districts, and two cities.

References

 

Counties of Khuzestan Province